ONEMI or National Office of Emergency of the Interior Ministry is a Chilean government agency dedicated to the prevention, organization, coordination and information relative to natural disasters. After the 1960 Valdivia earthquake a committee was formed to solve problems caused by the earthquake. However, this committee was not dissolved afterwards and in 1974, it acquired by law independent status as governmental office.

Other state funded agencies and services that cooperate with ONEMI are CONAF in terms related to forests and wildlife and OVDAS in monitoring volcanoes.

2010 Chile earthquake and trial
ONEMI has faced severe criticism after the 2010 Chile earthquake, the largest earthquake in Chile since the 1960 Valdivia earthquake. Criticism include the lack of coordination with other authorities and the SHOA (Hydrographic and Oceanographic Service of the Chilean Navy). ONEMI, SHOA and the government have been accused of the initial neglect of the tsunami warning sent by the Pacific Tsunami Warning Center, which resulted in the deaths of hundreds of civilians. Currently several of the members from the SHOA and ONEMI are facing trial in the Chilean justice.

See also

Ministry of the Interior and Public Security (Chile)

References

External links
 ONEMI's official site
 Ministry of Interior (Chile)'s official site

Government agencies of Chile
Natural disasters in Chile